Giorgi Kekelidze (born April 10, 1984)  is a Georgian poet, essayist and the founder of the first Georgian digital library, lib.ge.

Since March 2012 he has been general director of the National Parliamentary Library of Georgia.

Life
Born in Ozurgeti, Giorgi Kekelidze graduated from the Department of Philology at Tbilisi State University with master's degree in Humanitarian Sciences. From 2006 to 2008 he worked at the penal Institution of Rustavi as a teacher of the Georgian language and literature. Since 2009, he has presented various literary-critical programs at different radio stations.

From 2010 he is a literary columnist for the popular magazine Tabula. He delivers lectures on Classical literature at the Free University of Tbilisi. Since 2012 he hosts a literary show "Interpretation" on the Akhali Arkhi television channel.
In 2012 he founded a charitable organisations "Lib-Equilibrium" and "Lib-Club", which unites students and has a social and educational functions. In the same year, he became an author and a host of the show program "Litarea". He was awarded the literary prize "golden wing" for this program. In 2012, he founded an international audio-portal at Lyrikline.org and created the bilingual page.

In 2012, he was appointed as a director of National Parliamentary Library of Georgia. At the age of 27, he became the youngest head of the National Library of Georgia of all time.  The Georgian Parliament and the library offered him the job due to success of lib.ge. He began reforms in several directions - digitalization, service, TV programs, also opened various thematic corners, including foreign libraries etc. Georgian libraries opened in Istanbul, Kiev, Vienna and other countries' libraries. 
He created a library of e-learning library syndicate, which united regional libraries.
As a result of his activities in 2012, the National Library was awarded with the name of Tolerance of the Year.

In 2013, George Kekelidze met in a director of the Library of Congress, James Billington in Washington DC. As a result of their agreement, Georgian digital archives were opened for the archival of the world and the US archives for Georgia. At the same visit, the National Library was handed over to Boston archive of Zaldastanishvili and the New York Archives of Grigol Diasamidze. 
Giorgi Kekelidze's poetry evening was held in the Library of Congress also in 2012.

With his initiative, they opened the largest electronic room in Georgia - 40 tablet computers, free internet zone (puffs, armchairs, and electronic readers), publishers' corner with the latest books, presentation and movie-angle, as well as Georgian ecological hall and renovated children's room. He founded the literary prize for children's books in 2013.
Since 2013, every Friday, the program "The Other Middle Day" passes through Giorgi Kekelidze's rubric from the library of the National Library - the history of the old or rare Georgian books.

Since 2013 he is a TV host of the Maestro morning program and video-blog. With his initiative, the National Library opened a children's room, emigration hall, national digital photo gallery, public library for literacy and literacy. In the same year, the National Library was given a building in Kutaisi, where it was decided to create a home for foreign scholars.

In 2014 he published a publication in the Liberal magazine of Libraries. 
In 2014, with his initiative, the library and the first Mobile Company in Georgia, Geocell begin to seek and digest family-family photos throughout Georgia.
In 2015 the National Library joined the number of developed libraries in the world and raised the American integrated library program Sierra.

In 2015, he became a presenter on TV "Dila Books" - Rustavi 2. In 2015, it became a leading program - with a conveniently - radio Chocolate-Verbal Card (funtime.ge).

In 2017, with the initiative of Giorgi Kekelidze, the biggest Book Museum in Georgia was founded. The museum renovation and  equipment according to the contemporary standards is supported by the Georgian Industrial Group and David Bezhuashvili Foundation. The newly opened Book Museum is aimed to become "project of the century" and will be one of the main places for the meeting and seminars of book historians. All rare materials of the Library, stored in the closed repositories and not accessible to the wider public for many years, is proudly displayed in the Book Museum now.

Since 2017, Giorgi Kekelidze has been a full professor in the Georgian Language and Literature. He teaches at the European University Tbilisi and for the Sunday classes at the European School Tbilisi.

Creative life

In 2008, Giorgi Kekelidze published his first collection of poems called “Odebi”.
In addition to poems, there are marginal notes by several famous critics about the collection and it is decorated (designed) by David Meskhi's photos.
In 2010 some of his poems for children were published by the same publishing company in the collection of children poetry.

In 2011, the publishing house “Siesta” published Giorgi Kekelidze's poem “Korani” (as a part of a series called “Book on a Plate» (Tsigni Tefshze). Instead of standard publishing, books are being brought to the supermarkets, where the papers are placed and “packaged” on plastic plates, which normally are used for packaging frozen chickens, fish, vegetables, fruits or cakes. The idea of these series comes from American writer William S. Burroughs's novel “naked lunch). The idea of the title belongs to Jack Kerouac.

In 2010, Kekelidze’s poems were exhibited in art-installation made by Text/Gallery, in London.

In 2012, Vazha-Pshavela’s “Snake Eater” was published by Giorgi Kekelidze and Gigi Khornauli as an adapted comic-book version.

At the end of the 2012, Giorgi kekelidze and Mai Lashauri's combined album called “Miniatures” was published. In 2013t a movie called “Ambiente” based on Giorgi Kekelidze's works was released.

In 2013, a Georgian singer Ketato Charkviani recorded an experimental duet, which was also based on his poem.

In 2013, at the Frankfurt International Book Fair, there was a presentation of translation of Giorgi Kekelidze's trilingual (English, German, Russian) miniatures. A video-installation by Maia Machaladze and Mai Lashauri was also presented on the same festival. Giorgi Kekelidze turned up (appeared) in front of the audience wearing a T-shirt that said: „Russia Stop Creeping Annexation of Georgia“.

In 2014, a collection of his poems called “Poetry 2008-2013” was published. (Preface by Zurab Kiknadze).  In the same year,  he started creating a prosaic work called “Gurian Diaries».  At the same time, he was making video-sujet called “The Stories of the Repressed Gurians, a  region in Georgia. “Gurian Wedding Stories” which is based on narrations of Gurulebi became a bestseller from the moment of publishing.

In 2015 “Gurian Diaries” and Detective Series by  Kekelidze, attached to the newspaper “Kviris Palitra”, became the most popular editions. Especially actual became photo-series of the girls with the books, which caused diversity of attitudes. The number of first edition of “Gurian Diaries” was over 20 000.

The author transferred the money in the fond for leukaemia, because his father died of the same illness. His poetry does not include social or patriotic topics. Folklore is more interesting sphere for him. Kekelidze translated several works of Austrian poets, world literature tales collection called “magical door”, Sergei Dorenko's “Roman 2008”.

His poems are translated in English, Russian and Azeri languages. He is listed in the Azeri anthology of Georgian poets.
His works’ English translations and audio-versions were placed at the international web-site Lyrikline.org. About his creative works several letters and works are written by many georgian authors: Gaga Lomidze, Zaza Shatirishvili, Levan Berzenishvili, Revaz Siradze, Levan Bregadze, Zurab Kiknadze, Tengiz Kakacheishvili, Givi Alkhazishvili, Dalilda bedianidze, Tsira Barbaqadze, Lela Kodalashvili, Khatuna Tavdgridze, Giorgi Kiladze, Nata Varada, Jemal Injia, Oktai Kazumov, Sonia Kartvelishvili.

Awards and acknowledgements
2009-Georgian Literature Prize “Saba”-The best debut of the year for collected stories named “Odebi”

2010- Award from Ministry of Sport and Youth Affairs of Georgia- The most successful young man in literature field.
 
2010- Man of the year by the magazine “Hot Chocolate”.

2012- Man of the year by the magazine “Hot Chocolate”.

2013- 50 most successful graduates of Tbilisi state university.

2013- Wins a literature award named after Mushvig.

2014- Giorgi Kekelidze “Gurian Diaries” is acknowledged as the national bestseller of the year.

2015- Laureate of the Tsinandali award for the collected poems “Poetry 2008-2013”

2015- Author of the year in Georgian literature by the statistic of magazine EGO.

2015- won the Guram Rcheulishvili's award for the “Gurian Diaries”.

2015- Names 2015 for “Gurian Diaries” and for digital photo history (project of the year).

2016- Georgian public broadcaster's award for the year's educational project “Ekvilibriumi”, which aims to renew libraries in different Georgian villages. 
 
2016- The man of the 2016 year (organization “Amagdari”).

2016- an honorary freeman of Ozurgeti, hometown.

2016- Georgian public broadcaster's yearly award for the educational project electronic library.

2016- “Gurian Diaries” book 2, the bestseller of the year in Georgia.

References 

1984 births
Living people
People from Guria
21st-century poets from Georgia (country)
Male poets from Georgia (country)
21st-century male writers